Carlo D'Angelo (February 2, 1919 – June 9, 1973) was an Italian actor and voice actor.

Biography  
Born in Milan, the son of a Neapolitan father and a Florentine mother, at 9 years old D'Angelo was part of the Voci Bianche choir at La Scala. After studying law at the University of Milan, in 1941 he started working on radio and shortly later as a film dubber. In 1947 he made his stage debut at the  Piccolo Teatro di Milano, under Giorgio Strehler. In the 1950s he worked several times in the theatrical company of Vittorio Gassman, and in 1958 he formed a stage company together with Lia Zoppelli and Renzo Giovampietro.

Between 1963 and 1964, he got large critical acclaim for his performance in Il diavolo e il buon Dio, under the direction of Luigi Squarzina. D'Angelo was also active in films, where alternated major and character roles, and on television, where he had several significant roles in a number of TV-series. D'Angelo was also diction teacher at the Silvio d’Amico Academy of Dramatic Arts and recorded several albums of prose and poetry.

As a voice actor, D'Angelo provided the voice of Shere Khan in The Jungle Book and Jesus Christ in the italian political comedy I 2 deputati.

Death
D’Angelo died at the Sant’Orsola-Malpighi Polyclinic in Bologna on June 9, 1973, at the age of 54. He had undergone stomach surgery 25 days prior to his death.

Selected filmography

 La primadonna (1943)
 Uomini senza domani (1948)
 Giudicatemi! (1948)
 Ho sognato il paradiso (1950) - Magnaccia
 Fugitive in Trieste  (1951)
 Lorenzaccio (1951)
 Perdonami! (1953) - Commissioner
 Pietà per chi cade (1954) - Mari's defense attorney
 Land of the Pharaohs (1955) - Nabuna, Nellifer's Bodyguard (uncredited)
 Adriana Lecouvreur (1955)
 La ladra (1955) - Il Parocco
 The Rival (1956) - Primo ufficiale inquirente
 Terrore sulla città (1957) - Professor Gallura
 I Vampiri  (1957) - L'ispettore Chantal
 Dreams in a Drawer  (1957) - The Substitute
 La canzone più bella (1957) - Il Supplente
 L'ultima violenza (1957) - Notaio Bartoli
 The Adventures of Nicholas Nickleby (1958, TV series) - Newman Noggs
 Herod the Great (1959) - Man who saw the Messiah's birth
 Hercules Unchained (1959) - Creonte, High Priest of Thebes
 The Great War (1959) - Capitano Ferri
 David and Goliath (1960)
 Everybody Go Home (1960) - Partigiano napoletano
 Sword of the Conqueror (1961) - Falisque
 Pigeon Shoot (1961) - Mattei
 A Day for Lionhearts (1961)  - Il prete
 Nefertiti, Queen of the Nile (1961) - Seper
 Battle of the Worlds (1961) - Gen. Varreck
 Ten Italians for One German (1962) - Obersturmbannfuhrer Herbert Kappler
 Gli eroi del doppio gioco (1962) - Riccio
 The Verona Trial (1963) - Italo Vianini
 Giulietta e Romeo (1964) - Principe di Verona
 Secret Agent Super Dragon (1966) - Fernand Lamas
 One Thousand Dollars on the Black (1966) - Judge Waldorf
 VIP my Brother Superman (1968) - Narrator (voice)
 The Great Silence (1968) - Governor of Utah
 I 2 deputati (1968) - Statue of Jesus Christ (voice)

Notes

External links 

 
 https://www.antoniogenna.net/doppiaggio/game/199.htm
 

1919 births
1973 deaths
20th-century Italian male actors
Italian male film actors
Italian male television actors
Italian male stage actors
Italian male voice actors
Male actors from Milan
University of Milan alumni